Kåge River (Swedish: Kågeälven) is a river in Sweden.

References

Rivers of Västerbotten County